The following is a list of current National Hockey League (NHL) Eastern Conference team rosters:

Atlantic Division

Boston Bruins

Buffalo Sabres

Detroit Red Wings

Florida Panthers

Montreal Canadiens

Ottawa Senators

Tampa Bay Lightning

Toronto Maple Leafs

Metropolitan Division

Carolina Hurricanes

Columbus Blue Jackets

New Jersey Devils

New York Islanders

New York Rangers

Philadelphia Flyers

Pittsburgh Penguins

Washington Capitals

See also
List of current NHL Western Conference team rosters

References

Eastern Conference (NHL)
NHL Eastern Conference team rosters